is a passenger railway station  located in the city of Yonago, Tottori Prefecture, Japan. It is operated by the West Japan Railway Company (JR West).

Lines

Station layout
The station consists of one ground-level side platform located on the right side of the tracks when facing in the direction of Sakaiminato. There is no station building, but there is a hut-like waiting area on the platform. The station is unattended.

Adjacent stations

History
It as relocated 800 meters and renamed to its present name on June 15, 2008 due to the expansion of Yonago Airport.

Passenger statistics
In fiscal 2018, the station was used by an average of 118 passengers daily.

Surrounding area
Yonago Municipal Miho Junior High School
Yonago Municipal Oshinozu Elementary School
Asian Museum / Yasushi Inoue Memorial Hall

See also
List of railway stations in Japan

References

External links 

  Ōshinozuchō Station from JR-Odekake.net 

Railway stations in Japan opened in 1987
Railway stations in Tottori Prefecture
Stations of West Japan Railway Company
Yonago, Tottori